Gonçalo José Gonçalves dos Santos (born 15 November 1986) is a Portuguese former professional footballer who played as a defensive midfielder.

He spent most of his career in two spells at Estoril, making 72 Primeira Liga appearances for that club, Académica and Aves. He added 106 in the second tier for four teams, winning the 2012 title with Estoril. Abroad, he won two consecutive league and cup doubles with Dinamo Zagreb in Croatia.

Club career

Early years
Born in Lamego, Viseu District, Santos completed his formation at Associação Académica de Coimbra, where he made three Primeira Liga appearances in February 2009. He also had loans at G.D. Tourizense in the third division and C.D. Santa Clara and C.D. Aves of the second.

Santos joined G.D. Estoril Praia in July 2011. He played 28 matches – all starts – as they won the second tier, scoring once for the game's only at U.D. Oliveirense on 26 February 2012. The following 6 January, he scored his only goal in his country's top flight, consolation in a 1–3 home loss against S.L. Benfica.

Dinamo Zagreb
On 23 June 2014, Santos signed a three-year contract at GNK Dinamo Zagreb in the Croatian Football League. He made his debut on 11 July in the Super Cup, a 2–1 defeat to HNK Rijeka in which he was substituted at half-time for Marcelo Brozović; he won the league and cup double in each of his first two seasons, but played in neither cup final.

Return to Portugal
In June 2017, Santos returned to his country's top flight with Aves. The following 27 January, after only four competitive appearances, he went back to Estoril. Having been relegated in his first season back, he scored his first goal in over six years on 29 January 2019, opening a 2–1 win over S.C. Braga B at the Estádio António Coimbra da Mota; he served as club captain.

After a brief spell at Ethnikos Achna FC of the Cypriot First Division, Santos returned to Portugal's second tier on 27 January 2021, signing an 18-month deal at U.D. Vilafranquense. He started working as a manager with Real SC, as assistant.

Honours
Estoril
Liga de Honra: 2011–12

Dinamo Zagreb
Croatian First Football League: 2014–15, 2015–16
Croatian Football Cup: 2014–15, 2015–16

References

External links

1986 births
Living people
People from Lamego
Sportspeople from Viseu District
Portuguese footballers
Association football midfielders
Primeira Liga players
Liga Portugal 2 players
Segunda Divisão players
Associação Académica de Coimbra – O.A.F. players
G.D. Tourizense players
C.D. Santa Clara players
C.D. Aves players
G.D. Estoril Praia players
U.D. Vilafranquense players
Croatian Football League players
GNK Dinamo Zagreb players
Cypriot First Division players
Ethnikos Achna FC players
Portuguese expatriate footballers
Expatriate footballers in Croatia
Expatriate footballers in Cyprus
Portuguese expatriate sportspeople in Croatia
Portuguese expatriate sportspeople in Cyprus